Anthony Paez (born June 18, 1984, in Brooklyn, New York, United States) is a professional basketball player, currently starring in Hungary for Dombóvár KC of the Hungarian Basketball League.

He attended college at Stephen F. Austin from 2004-2006. In the 2004/05 season, Paez made appearances in 27 games, averaging 27 minutes per game, as well as 10.8 points per game, 4.6 rebounds per game and a .705 free-throw percentage. In his second season, his stats improved slightly as did his minutes. In 29 appearances, the Small forward averaged 11.6 points in 28.4 minutes per game, coupled with 2.3 assists and 4.7 boards per outing.

After graduation, Paez signed a deal with Danish club AaB Aalborg for the 2006-07 season. Despite the clubs failings (3-19, 11th-place finish out of 12), he led the stats board in points per game with 27.73, while being named in the All-Danish Basketliga 2nd Team, All-Imports Team, All-Newcomers Team, as well as being featured in the Basketliga All-Star Game and finishing 2nd in the 2007 Slam Dunk competition.

After much speculation, it was officially publicised on August 29, 2007, that Paez had agreed a deal with British Basketball League side Worcester Wolves, to become their third and final import player for the upcoming season. Wolves' coach Skouson Harker commented that Paez "can score inside and out and is a fearless player that lets his game do the talking. I fully expect Anthony to rise to the challenge and be a top performer in the BBL this season."

Career history
2006-07  AaB Aalborg
2007-2008  Worcester Wolves
2008–present  Dombóvár KC
2008–present  Worcester Wolves
2009-2010  Oberwart Gunners

1984 births
Living people
American expatriate basketball people in Austria
American expatriate basketball people in Denmark
American expatriate basketball people in Hungary
American expatriate basketball people in the United Kingdom
American men's basketball players
Basketball players from New York City
Sportspeople from Brooklyn
Stephen F. Austin Lumberjacks basketball players
Worcester Wolves players
Small forwards